Jasmin Moranjkić (born 11 October 1983) is a Bosnian football coach and retired professional footballer who currently works as an assistant coach at Bosnian Premier League club Tuzla City.

International career
Moranjkić made his debut for Bosnia and Herzegovina in an unofficial friendly match against Poland in December 2007. It remained his sole international appearance.

References

Nikolić i Moranjkić prešli iz Slobode u Radnički iz Lukavca‚ scsport.ba, 26 January 2016

External links

1983 births
Living people
People from Vlasenica
Association football midfielders
Bosnia and Herzegovina footballers
FK Sloboda Tuzla players
NK Čelik Zenica players
NK Zvijezda Gradačac players
OFK Gradina players
FK Radnički Lukavac players
FK Tuzla City players
Premier League of Bosnia and Herzegovina players
First League of the Federation of Bosnia and Herzegovina players